Magallanes Department is a department in Santa Cruz Province, Argentina. It has a population of 6,536 (2001) and an area of 19,805 km². The seat of the department is in Puerto San Julián.

Municipalities
Puerto San Julián

References
Instituto Nacional de Estadísticas y Censos, INDEC

Departments of Santa Cruz Province, Argentina